is a story first published by Shueisha as a manga by Hijiri Chiaki, and then made into a short-running TV drama in 2008 by Nihon Television, directed by Satoru Nakajima. The story is about a 15-year-old girl named Yoko, who is being tormented by her older sister Makiko. Only Yoko and her parents know her sister's true nature, while other people are fooled by her unbelievable good luck.

Plot
15-year-old Yoko is constantly tormented by her self-centered and fiendish older sister Makiko, who works for a government office after having graduated from a famous university. But despite her ill nature, Makiko's actions tend to somehow make things better for those around her, causing others to praise her as an "ally of justice."

Because of her sister's attitude, Yoko longs to be free. She decides to get her sister married so she will move out. However her plan backfires. There is also a boy called Riku whose infatuation with Yoko leads him to tease her persistently. Eventually, he becomes one of her closest confidants.

Makiko finally reveals her true nature to her husband, Naoki, who decides to get a divorce.  Meanwhile, a close friend of Riku's, Chika, tells Yoko that he is about to move away. Her friends attempt to get Yoko to confess through a live T.V. program but her sister storms in and starts yelling at her, just before Yoko is about to confess. Makiko is hauled away by security.

A few days later, Naoki and his parents arrive to talk with Makiko. As the divorce is about to be finalized, Makiko tells everyone that she is pregnant and the divorce is cancelled, as they think the only reason she was distant and mean was because she was pregnant. Later, Yoko asks Naoki if he knows that her sister is a demon and Naoki tells Yoko that he likes that "demonic" side because it is the real her. The series ends with Yoko finally talking to Riku before he departs for Osaka and Makiko giving birth to her baby. Yoko is the one eventually left caring for the baby.

Cast

Shida Mirai - Nakata Yoko
Yu Yamada - Nakata Makiko / Yoshikawa Makiko
Osamu Mukai - Yoshikawa Naoki
Hongo Kanata - Okamoto Riku
Takizawa Saori - Yamashita Midori
Jingi Irie - Komori Taichi (Jyanbo)
Nishiuchi Mariya - Moriyama Chika
Nakamura Shizuka - Komatsu Kyoko
Shimura Rena - Shimazaki Mai
Ishii Mieko - Horita Arisa
Sano Shiro - Nakata Goro
Tanaka Yoshiko - Nakata Haruko
Tokui Yuu - Nogami Koichiro

Production credits
Original writing (manga): Seigi no Mikata by Hijiri Chiaki
Screenwriters: Ouki Shizuka(ep1-3,5,7,9-10), Seki Erika (ep4,8), Fukuma Masahiro(ep6)
Producers: Tsugiya Hisashi, Okubo Tomomi
Directors: Nakajima Satoru(ep1-2,5,7,9-10), Abe Yuichi(ep3-4,6,8)
Music: Konishi Yasuharu

External links
Official TV drama site 

Japanese drama television series
2004 manga
2008 Japanese television series debuts
2008 Japanese television series endings
Nippon TV dramas
Shueisha franchises